P122 may refer to

 
 Papyrus 122, a biblical manuscript
 , a patrol boat of the Turkish Navy
 P122, a state regional road in Latvia